Elm Island Lake is a lake in Aitkin County, Minnesota, in the United States. It was named for the lake island it contains where elm trees grow.

See also
List of lakes in Minnesota

References

Lakes of Minnesota
Lakes of Aitkin County, Minnesota